Cyaniriodes is a genus of butterflies in the family Lycaenidae. The genus was erected by Lionel de Nicéville in 1890.

Species
Cyaniriodes libna (Hewitson, 1869) southern Burma (Mergui), Thailand, Peninsular Malaysia, Langkawi Island 
Cyaniriodes siraspiorum Schröder & Treadaway, 1979 Philippines

References

Poritiinae
Taxa named by Lionel de Nicéville
Lycaenidae genera